The Chinese in Mexico, 1882–1940 is a 2010 book by Robert Chao Romero, published by the University of Arizona Press, about the history of Chinese immigration to Mexico. This is the first English-language monograph written about Chinese immigration to Mexico. Anju Reejhsinghani of University of Wisconsin-Stevens Point described it as "a social history of the small but influential Chinese merchant and laboring community in northern Mexico in the first half of the twentieth century." Erika Lee of the University of Minnesota stated that because much of the existing literature on Asian immigration to North and South America discusses the United States, this book "fills an enormous historiographical gap."

The topics include anti-Chinese discrimination and Chinese settlement patterns. The book has printed examples of anti-Chinese propaganda, including song lyrics and political cartoons, produced in Mexico. Lee stated that Romero's method of cataloging the relationships in the community, which include economic and social relations, is the "diasporic transnational" method which illustrates the simultaneous Chinese-Mexican ties to other Chinese communities in the Americas and their home villages in southern China. Of three books about the Chinese-Mexican community, with the others being Chinese Mexicans: Transpacific Migration and the Search for a Homeland, 1910–1960 and Making the Chinese Mexican: Global Migration, Localism, and Exclusion in the U.S.-Mexico Borderlands, Reejhsinghani described The Chinese in Mexico as the "most accessible".

Background
Robert Chao Romero is a professor at the University of California, Los Angeles in the César E. Chávez Department of Chicana and Chicano Studies. The book originated as a PhD dissertation.

The author used archival records from Mexico and the United States. These archival records included municipal census manuscripts from Mexico produced in the 1930s, reports from U.S. consulates, and Immigration and Naturalization Service (INS) Chinese Exclusion Act case files. The census manuscripts include demographic information about the community. The U.S. files have information about Chinese who entered Southern California and then traveled onwards to Mexico, their final destination.

Contents
The first two chapters, including the first main chapter, discuss Chinese immigration patterns, covering those the world and giving context to the immigration to Mexico. The topics include chain migration of families, international recruitment of contract labor, and smuggling of immigrants. The first main chapter discusses reasons why many Chinese immigrated from Guangdong.

The next two chapters discuss the transnational nature of Chinese-Mexican life. Within Chapter 4, there is content about interracial marriages between Mexicans and Chinese, specifically between Chinese males and Mexican females. This chapter also discusses overall patterns of marriages and families and gender aspects of the Chinese in Mexico. The chapter discusses the Mexican attitudes against these marriages; some Mexican males believed the fact that Chinese men were marrying Mexican women threatened their sense of manhood.

Chapter 5 discusses the types of jobs held by Chinese-Mexicans, Chinese-Mexican community organizations, and disputes about the opium business; the Tong Wars, discussed in the chapter, occurred in the 1920s. Chapter 6 discusses the reception of the Mexican people to Chinese immigration; the information on anti-Chinese sentiment is included in this chapter. In the final chapter the author proposes establishing a dedicated field of study of Chinese-Latin Americans.

Reception

May-Lee Chai of San Francisco State University wrote that the book is "a fascinating study" that "provides a much-needed corrective."

Erika Lee of the University of Minnesota wrote that the book "is a powerful and important example of just how promising the development of [the field of Chinese-Latin American studies] could be."

Reejhsinghani stated that the three books about the Chinese Mexicans, including The Chinese in Mexico, "are well written, amply documented, and groundbreaking in scope" but that "their transnational focus might make challenging reading for those lacking training in Asian, Asian American, Latin American, or world history."

References
 Camacho, Julia María Schiavone (The University of Texas at El Paso). "The Chinese in Mexico, 1882-1940" (book review). The Journal of Asian Studies, May, 2011, Vol.70(2), p. 543-545 - DOI 10.1017/S0021911811000350
 Chai, May-Lee (San Francisco State University). "The Chinese in Mexico, 1882-1940" (book review). Asian Affairs: An American Review, Jan-March, 2012, Vol.39(1), p. 71-72 [Peer Reviewed Journal]
 Lee, Erika (University of Minnesota). "The Chinese in Mexico, 1882-1940" (book review). Pacific Historical Review, Nov, 2011, Vol.80(4), p. 644(3) [Peer Reviewed Journal] - DOI 10.1525/phr.2011.80.4.644 - Available at JSTOR
 Lim, Julian. "Chinos and Paisanos: Chinese Mexican Relations in the Borderlands." Pacific Historical Review  79.1 (2010): 50-85. online
 López, Kathleen (Rutgers University). "The Chinese in Mexico, 1882-1940" (book review). Hispanic American Historical Review, Feb, 2012, Vol.92(1), p. 193-195 [Peer Reviewed Journal] - 10.1215/00182168-1471112
 Reejhsinghani, Anju (University of Wisconsin-Stevens Point). "Emerging transnational scholarship: Chinese Mexicans in China, Mexico, and the United States-Mexico borderlands.(The Chinese in Mexico, 1882-1940; Chinese Mexicans: Transpacific Migration and the Search for a Homeland, 1910-1960; Making the Chinese Mexican: Global Migration, Localism, and Exclusion in the U.S.-Mexico Borderlands)(Book review)" Journal of American Ethnic History, Spring, 2014, Vol.33(3), p. 77(8) [Peer Reviewed Journal] - DOI 10.5406/jamerethnhist.33.3.0077

Notes

Further reading
 González, Fredy (Yale University). "Moving across the Transnational Commercial Orbit." H-LatAm, Humanities and Social Sciences Net Online. February 2012.
 Marquez, Letisia. "History of Chinese in Mexico documented for first time in English-language book" (Archive). University of California, Los Angeles. December 16, 2010.
 Padmanabhan, Swati. "Neglected history of Chinese community in Mexico recognized in Assistant Professor Robert Chao Romero’s new book" (Archive). The Daily Bruin. January 28, 2011.

External links
 The Chinese in Mexico - University of Arizona
 Contents of the book available at Project MUSE

Books about Mexico
2010 non-fiction books
Chinese diaspora in Mexico
University of Arizona Press books